Shabba can refer:
Shabba Ranks, a dancehall rapper
"Shabba" (song), by A$AP Ferg

See also
Shaba (disambiguation)
Shabbat
Shabbas goy